In the 2014–15 season, JS Saoura competed in the Ligue 1 for the 3rd season, as well as the Algerian Cup. On February 24, 2015, Mustapha Kouici was appointed as the club's general manager for a period of 18 months, Kouici has pledged to put his experience and knowledge at the disposal of the team for the sole purpose of putting it on the right track.

Squad list
Players and squad numbers last updated on 18 November 2010.Note: Flags indicate national team as has been defined under FIFA eligibility rules. Players may hold more than one non-FIFA nationality.

Competitions

Overview

Ligue 1

League table

Results summary

Results by round

Matches

Algerian Cup

Squad information

Goalscorers
Includes all competitive matches. The list is sorted alphabetically by surname when total goals are equal.

Transfers

In

Out

References

JS Saoura seasons
Algerian football clubs 2014–15 season